Drymusa is a genus of false violin spiders that was first described by Eugène Simon in 1892. They physically resemble violin spiders (Loxosceles), but their bites are not believed to be medically significant. Originally placed with the spitting spiders, it was moved to the Loxoscelidae (now a synonym for Sicariidae) in 1981, then to the Drymusidae in 1986.

Species
They occur in the Caribbean and South America.  it contains twelve species:
Drymusa armasi Alayón, 1981 – Cuba
Drymusa canhemabae Brescovit, Bonaldo & Rheims, 2004 – Brazil
Drymusa colligata Bonaldo, Rheims & Brescovit, 2006 – Brazil
Drymusa dinora Valerio, 1971 – Costa Rica
Drymusa nubila Simon, 1892 (type) – St. Vincent
Drymusa philomatica Bonaldo, Rheims & Brescovit, 2006 – Brazil
Drymusa rengan Labarque & Ramírez, 2007 – Chile
Drymusa serrana Goloboff & Ramírez, 1992 – Argentina
Drymusa simoni Bryant, 1948 – Hispaniola
Drymusa spectata Alayón, 1981 – Cuba
Drymusa spelunca Bonaldo, Rheims & Brescovit, 2006 – Brazil
Drymusa tobyi Bonaldo, Rheims & Brescovit, 2006 – Brazil

References

Araneomorphae genera
Drymusidae
Taxa named by Eugène Simon